Euston Bus Station serves the Euston area of Camden, London, England. The station is owned and maintained by Transport for London.

It is situated next to Euston main line railway station and above Euston Underground station and near Euston Square. It was designed by Richard Seifert and opened in 1979.

There are five stands at the bus station that are served by routes operated by Arriva London, London Central, London General, London United, Metroline, Stagecoach London and Tower Transit.

London Buses routes 18, 30, 59, 68, 73, 91, 168, 205, 253, 390 and night routes N5, N20, N73, N91, N205 and N253 serve the bus station.

See also
List of bus and coach stations in London

References

External links
Transport for London

Bus stations in London
Richard Seifert buildings
Transport in the London Borough of Camden